A digital billboard is a billboard that displays digital images that are changed by a computer every few seconds.  Digital billboards are primarily used for advertising, but they can also serve public service purposes. These are positioned on highly visible, heavy traffic locations such as expressways and major roadways.

History  
The first proper billboards were invented in the 1830s by Jared Bell in America. He wanted to advertise a circus and put up a large and colourful billboard in 1835. P.T. Barnum saw the benefits of this advertising medium, and also followed suit. In 2005, the first digital billboards were installed.

Safety concerns 
There have been concerns regarding road safety when digital billboards are present. The Federal Highway Administration (FHWA) conducted a study in 2001 to review the effects of electronic billboards (EBBs) on crash rates. According to the FHWA, it appeared that there was no effective technique or method appropriate for evaluating the safety effects of EBBs on driver attention or distraction at that time. More recent and extensive studies have affirmed the negative impact of digital billboards on driver attention.

Today 46 states have passed laws permitting digital billboards, compared to approximately 33 in 2007. As of July 1, 2016, the OAAA reports that there are approximately 6,700 digital billboards installed in the U.S., and there are now over 1,000 localities allowing digital billboards.

The Development Of Brightness Evaluation Method For Digital Billboards
In order to reduce glare caused by digital billboards, the brightness evaluation method was created. Billboard luminance levels are one of the factors taken into account when trying to resolve this issue. A Lux Meter can be used to measure the Luminance levels needed to keep the sign visible and safe to aid in this procedure.

References
[Krumina, Volberga, L., Ikaunieks, G., & Naumovs, L. (2021). The Development Of Brightness Evaluation Method For Digital Billboards. IOP Conference Series. Materials Science and Engineering, 1202(1), 12035–. https://doi.org/10.1088/1757-899X/1202/1/012035]

Fortenberry Jr, J. L., Elrod, J. K., & McGoldrick, P. J. (2010). Is billboard advertising beneficial for healthcare organizations? An investigation of efficacy and acceptability to patients. Journal of Healthcare Management, 55(2).

Billboards

ar:لوحة رقمية